Giovanni Pellegrini  (28 September 1908 – 11 May 1995) was an Italian architect.

He went to Libya in 1933 and distinguished himself as a colonial architect of Italian Rationalism, designing several buildings and planned towns in Tripolitania. After World War II he designed public housing and urban plans in the city of Milan.

References

Bibliography
 
 
 
 
 
 
 

20th-century Italian architects
Architects from Milan
1908 births
1995 deaths
Polytechnic University of Milan alumni